The 2014 United States House of Representatives elections in Florida were held on Tuesday, November 4, 2014 to elect the 27 U.S. representatives from the state of Florida, one from each of the state's 27 congressional districts. The elections coincided with the elections of other federal and state offices, including Governor of Florida. There was no net party change, as Democrat Gwen Graham defeated Republican incumbent Steve Southerland in the 2nd district, while Republican Carlos Curbelo defeated Democratic incumbent Joe Garcia in the 26th district.

Overview
Results of the 2014 United States House of Representatives elections in Florida by district:

District 1
Republican Jeff Miller has represented the district since 2001. Retired Army officer and 2010 Democratic nominee Jim Bryan is challenging him again as a Democrat.

Republican primary

General election

District 2
Republican Steve Southerland has represented the district since being elected in 2010.

Gwen Graham, a Leon County school administrator and the daughter of Bob Graham, a former United States Senator and Governor of Florida, announced that she would run against incumbent Republican Congressman Steve Southerland in 2014. She won the race by a narrow 1.2% margin.

General election

Polling

Results

District 3
Republican Ted Yoho has represented the district since 2012, defeating Republican incumbent Cliff Stearns in the primary.

Jake Rush, an attorney and former Alachua County Sheriff's deputy is challenging Yoho in the Republican primary.  Following the launch of his campaign, he received national media attention related to his involvement with live action role-playing (particularly the supernaturally themed Mind's Eye Theatre) and costuming.

Middle school art teacher Marihelen Wheeler challenged Yoho as a Democrat.

Republican primary

General election

District 4
Republican Ander Crenshaw has represented the district since 2000. US Navy veteran Ryman Shoaf challenged Crenshaw in the Republican primary. The Democratic Party did not run a candidate in this race.

Republican primary

General election

District 5
Democrat Corrine Brown has represented the district since being elected in 2012. She previously represented the 3rd district from 1993 to 2013, prior to the decennial redistricting. Businesswoman Glo Smith, a former staff aide to Lt. Gov. Jennifer Carroll, is challenging Brown as a Republican.

Republican primary

General election

District 6
Republican Ron DeSantis has represented the district since being elected in 2012. David Cox, director of resources at Bethune-Cookman University, is challenging DeSantis as a Democrat.

General election

District 7
Republican John Mica has represented the 7th District, which includes most of Seminole County, the main campus of the University of Central Florida in Orange County, and parts of Deltona in Volusia County, since 1992. In 2012, when Mica ran for re-election in the redrawn district, he won with 59% of the vote, his smallest margin of victory in twenty years. Congressman Mica is running for re-election in 2014, and he was challenged by Wes Neuman, a Democrat who served as a White House intern and worked as an analyst for LMI.

Polling taken during the 2013 government shutdown showed that Mica was vulnerable to an opponent, with only 33% of the district's voters indicating that they approved of his performance, while 50% disapproved. The early predictions proved to be unfounded, and Mica's popularity rebounded considerably over the summer of 2014. Mica was a heavy favorite to win the GOP primary, and on August 26, trounced his GOP challengers with over 72% of the vote.

On September 25, 2014, after over a month of keeping a low profile, Democratic challenger Wes Neuman announced he "made a mistake" in challenging Mica and would no longer be actively campaigning. Al Krulick appeared on the ballot with no party affiliation.

Republican primary

General election

Polling

Results

District 8
Republican Bill Posey has represented the district since being elected in 2012. He previously represented the 15th district from 2009 to 2013, prior to the decennial redistricting.

General election

District 9
Democrat Alan Grayson has represented the district since being elected in 2012. He previously represented the 8th district from 2009 to 2011, prior to the decennial redistricting. Grayson was challenged in the primary by Democrat Nick Ruiz, a professor from the University of Florida. In 2012, Ruiz ran for the Democratic nomination in FL-07, but lost to Jason Kendall. Ruiz made a somewhat surprising move to FL-09 for 2014, but was defeated handily by Grayson in the primary 74%-26%.

On the Republican side, a three-way primary race was held between Carol Platt, Jorge Bonilla, and businessman Peter Vivaldi. Platt, who is from the Osceola County Realtors Association, received endorsements from Jeb Bush and Marco Rubio, and took 54.4% of the vote. Bonilla, a navy veteran, finished a distant second, and Vivaldi third.

The general election will pit Grayson against Platt, along with independent Marko Milakovich.

Republican primary

Democratic primary

General election

Polling

Results

District 10
Republican Daniel Webster has represented the district since being elected in 2012. He previously represented the 8th district from 2011 to 2013, prior to the decennial redistricting. Val Demings, who was the Democratic nominee in 2012, considered a second run against Webster, but chose to run for Mayor of Orange County, Florida, instead. Ultimately, she pulled out of that race as well. Webster was unopposed in the Republican primary.

On the Democrat side, three candidates faced off in the August 26 primary. The candidates includes former Eustis City Commissioner William Ferree, civil rights lawyer and Trayvon Martin family attorney Shayan Modarres, and former Navy Chief Petty Officer Mike McKenna. McKenna, a Walt Disney World security officer (49.73%) won the Democratic primary, and will face Webster in the November general election. McKenna spent only $5,000 on his primary campaign, a fraction of his two opponents.

In the general election, Webster was a decided favorite, and ran only a few television ads. With very little money in his campaign funds, McKenna ran no ads, instead counting on a grass-roots, "door-to-door" campaign. Webster easily cruised to reelection by a margin of 62% to 38%.

Democratic primary

General election

District 11
Republican Rich Nugent has represented the district since being elected in 2012. He previously represented the 5th district from 2011 to 2013, prior to the decennial redistricting.

General election

District 12
Republican Gus Bilirakis has represented the district since being elected in 2012. He previously represented the 9th district from 2007 to 2013, prior to the decennial redistricting. No candidates filed to challenge Bilirakis for his seat, so he will return to office without standing for election in 2014.

District 13

On October 9, 2013, Republican Bill Young, who had held this Tampa Bay-area district since 1971, announced that he would not run for re-election to a twenty-second term in 2014. He died 9 days later and a special election was held, which Republican David Jolly won. Jolly is running for a full term.

Republican primary
Candidates
Declared
 David Jolly, incumbent U.S. Representative

Democratic primary
Candidates
No Democratic candidate filed to run for Congress before the end of the qualifying period. The Democratic Congressional Campaign Committee announced that it would support Independent candidate Ed Jany. Jany dropped out of the race on May 13, 2014.

Withdrew
 Manuel Sykes, president of the St. Petersburg NAACP

Declined
 Charlie Crist, former Republican Governor of Florida and Independent candidate for the U.S. Senate in 2010 (running for Governor)
 Jessica Ehrlich, lawyer and nominee for the seat in 2012
 Charlie Justice, Pinellas County Commissioner and nominee for Florida's 10th congressional district in 2010
 Rick Kriseman, former state representative and Mayor of St. Petersburg
 Eric Lynn, senior White House Middle East policy adviser and former aide to Congressman Peter Deutsch
 Darryl Rouson, state representative
 Alex Sink, former chief financial officer of Florida, nominee for governor in 2010 and nominee for the seat in the special election
 Ken Welch, Pinellas County Commissioner
 Peter Rudy Wallace, former Speaker of the Florida House of Representatives

Polling

Libertarian candidates
 Lucas Overby, activist, commercial diver, and nominee for the seat in the special election

Independent candidates
Withdrew
 Ed Jany, retired Army Colonel

General election
Candidates
 David Jolly (Republican)
 Lucas Overby (Libertarian)

Polling

Results

District 14
Democrat Kathy Castor has represented the district since being elected in 2012. She previously represented the 11th district from 2007 to 2013, prior to the decennial redistricting. No candidates filed to challenge Castor for her seat, so she will return to office without standing for election in 2014.

District 15
Republican Dennis A. Ross has represented the district since being elected in 2012. He previously represented the 12th district from 2011 to 2013, prior to the decennial redistricting. Alan Cohn, a former investigative reporter, is the Democratic nominee.

General election

Polling

Results

District 16
Republican Vern Buchanan has represented the district since being elected in 2012. He previously represented the 16th district from 2009 to 2013, prior to the decennial redistricting. 101-year-old Joe Newman is running as a write-in candidate.

General election

Results

District 17
Republican Tom Rooney has represented the district since being elected in 2012. He previously represented the 13th district from 2007 to 2013, prior to the decennial redistricting.

General election

District 18

Democrat Patrick Murphy has represented the district since being elected in 2012, defeating Republican incumbent Allen West. West has said he will not run again. Republican Adam Hasner, the former Majority Leader of the Florida House of Representatives and nominee for the 22nd congressional district in 2012 had considered running but ultimately declined to do so. Republican Juno Beach Councilwoman Ellen Andel, who had declared her candidacy in May 2013, withdrew from the race in February 2014. Despite West's endorsement, she posted poor fundraising numbers and began 2014 with only $5,537 cash-on-hand, to Murphy's $1.8 million. Still in the race for the Republican nomination are Jupiter nurse Beverly Hires, former state representative Carl J. Domino, former Tequesta Councilman Calvin Turnquest, Stuart computer software developer Brian Lara, and former mayor of Derby, Connecticut, former Connecticut State Representative and nominee for the U.S. Senate from Connecticut in 2006 Alan Schlesinger.

Republican primary

General election

Polling

 * Internal poll for the Patrick Murphy campaign

Results

District 19

Republican Trey Radel was elected to represent the 19th district in 2012. He resigned on January 27, 2014, requiring a special election to fill the remainder of his term.  That election was won by fellow Republican Curt Clawson.

Republican primary
Candidates
Declared
 Paige Kreegel, former state representative and candidate for the 19th congressional district in 2012

Potential
 Chauncey Goss, political consultant and candidate for the 19th congressional district in 2012
 Connie Mack IV, former U.S. Representative and nominee for U.S. Senate in 2012

Declined
 Lizbeth Benacquisto, state senator

General election

District 20
Democrat Alcee Hastings has represented the district since being elected in 2012. He previously represented the 13th district from 1993 to 2013, prior to the decennial redistricting.

Democratic primary

General election

District 21
Democrat Ted Deutch has represented the district since being elected in 2012. He previously represented the 19th district from 2010 to 2013, prior to the decennial redistricting.

Democratic primary

General election

District 22
Democrat Lois Frankel has represented the district since being elected in 2012.

Republican primary

General election

District 23
Democrat Debbie Wasserman Schultz has represented the district since being elected in 2012. She previously represented the 20th district from 2005 to 2013, prior to the decennial redistricting.

Republican primary

General election

District 24
Democrat Frederica Wilson has represented the district since being elected in 2012. She previously represented the 17th district from 2011 to 2013, prior to the decennial redistricting.

Democratic primary

General election

District 25
Republican Mario Diaz-Balart has represented the district since 2012. He previously represented the 21st district from 2011 to 2013, as well as a different version of the 25th from 2003 to 2011, prior to the decennial redistricting. No candidates filed to challenge Diaz-Balart for his seat, so he will return to office without standing for election in 2014.

District 26

Democrat Joe García has represented the 26th district since being elected in 2012.

Republican primary
Candidates
Declared
 Carlos Curbelo, member of the Miami-Dade County Public School Board
 Ed MacDougall, mayor of Cutler Bay
 Joe Martinez, former Miami-Dade County commissioner
 David Rivera, former U.S. Representative

Declined
 Anitere Flores, state senator

Results

General election

Polling

Results

District 27

Republican Ileana Ros-Lehtinen represented the district since being elected in 2012. She previously represented the 18th district from 1989 to 2013, prior to the decennial redistricting. No candidates filed to challenge Ros-Lehtinen for her seat, so she returned to office without standing for election in 2014.

See also
 2014 United States House of Representatives elections
 2014 United States elections

References

External links
U.S. House elections in Florida, 2014 at Ballotpedia
Campaign contributions at OpenSecrets

Florida
2014
United States House of Representatives